Mohandas is a 2008 Hindi drama film directed by Mazhar Kamran based on a story by noted Hindi writer Uday Prakash. The film stars Sonali Kulkarni, Nakul Vaid, Sushant Singh, Uttam Halder, Sharbani Mukherjee and Aditya Srivastava and is produced by Abha Sonakia.

Mohandas was released on 4 September 2009. The film received positive reviews and was nominated for the Grand Prix at the Fribourg International Film Festival.

Synopsis 
Born in a poor family, young Mohandas lands an important job at the 'Oriental Coal Mines'. However, his success story is brutally disrupted when somebody steals his identity and takes his place in his name. A local journalist tapes the story which reaches Meghna, an Indian television star newsreader in Delhi, a Kafkaesque tale of identity theft that becomes a searing indictment of bureaucratic corruption and conspiracy.

Plot 
Meghna(Sonali Kulkarni), a news correspondent in Delhi, one day receives a videotape from a remote place in central India. On the tape, a battered young man claims to be the real Mohandas and alleges that someone else has stolen his identity. Someone else is living as 'Mohandas'. Intrigued by what looks like an unusual small-town scam, Meghna makes  a trip to Anuppur. There,  she unearths a more harrowing and surreal story. Mohandas(Nakul Vaid) is a topper in studies from the poor community of basket-weavers and is overjoyed at long last when he is selected for a good white-collar post in Oriental Coal Mines. But he is kept waiting and waiting to actually get the job. Long afterwards, when he has given up and reconciled to it, he learns that someone else has  assumed his name and has already taken his job!  When he rushes to protest, he is beaten up and thrown out.  Meghna places this story in the media. Harshvardhan(Aditya Srivastava), a lawyer from the district, takes this case of stolen identity to court with the intention of hauling up the usurper. With more bizarre results.

Cast 
 Nakul Vaid as Mohandas
 Sonali Kulkarni as Meghna Sengupta
 Sharbani Mukherji
 Sushant Singh
 Govind Namdeo as Muktibodh
 Uttam Halder
 Aditya Srivastava as Advocate Harshvardhan Soni
 Akhilendra Mishra

Reception 
The film was critically acclaimed. Film critic Namrata Joshi wrote in Outlook  "Hindi litterateur Uday Prakash’s Mohandas is a compelling tale about a young man in small-town MP struggling to reclaim his job and identity, stolen by a crook. Mazhar Kamran turns it into a simple, sincere and persuasive film."   Avijit Ghosh wrote in his review in the Times of India "Mohandas is the sort of film that Govind Nihalani and his ilk don't make any more. Not that the film is an angry or persuasive visual document like Aakrosh or Ardh Satya, but director-cinematographer Mazhar Kamran's maiden offering shows a willingness to engage and dares to raise uncomfortable questions that feel-good Bollywood prefers to ignore these days." Utpal Borpujari writing in the Deccan Herald remarked that "It is an important film of recent films"  Shoma Chatterji wrote in an essay on the film : "Kamran has gathered an ensemble cast of actors chosen mostly from television. Each one of them has performed brilliantly, their characters one with themselves."

Accolades 
 Special Jury Prize at Innsbruck International Film Festival Austria.
 Nominated – 2009 Grand Prix ( Le Regard d'Or ) at Fribourg International Film Festival ( Artistic Director Édouard Waintrop )
 Nominated – 2008 South Asian International Film Festival New York
 Nominated – 2008 Osian's-Cinefan Film Festival New Delhi
 2009 Selected in the "New Directors Emerging in the International Scene" section of the 52nd San Francisco International Film Festival

References

External links 
 
 Mohandas at Rotten Tomatoes
 Mohandas at AllRovi
 Minty Tejpal in Mumbai Mirror
 Namrata Joshi in Outlook magazine
 Utpal Borpujari in Deccan herald
 Shoma Chatterji in India Together
 Identity crisis
 From Satya to Mohandas : Interview with Mazhar Kamran.

2000s Hindi-language films
2008 films